Samuel Ernest Wright (November 20, 1946 – May 24, 2021) was an American actor and singer. He was best known as the voice of Sebastian in Disney's The Little Mermaid, for which he provided the lead vocals to "Under the Sea", which won the Academy Award for Best Original Song. He played Dizzy Gillespie in Bird, the biographical film about Charlie Parker. Wright also played the part of Mufasa in the original cast of The Lion King on Broadway and voiced Kron the Iguanodon in Disney's 2000 CGI/live-action film Dinosaur.

Early life
Wright was born on November 20, 1946, in Camden, South Carolina. Wright was a student at Camden High School, where he was involved with sports and the arts.

Career
In 1968, Wright moved to New York City to pursue his acting career full time. Wright was nominated for a Tony Award in 1984 for Best Featured Actor in a Musical for his performance in The Tap Dance Kid and again in 1998 for Best Featured Actor in a Musical as the original lead actor for Mufasa in The Lion King, the Broadway version of Disney's animated classic of the same name. Wright was chosen to play the Scarecrow in the 1995 Apollo Theater Revival of The Wiz alongside Whitney Houston, Keith David, and Cedric the Entertainer. Wright  originated the part of "Sam" in Over Here! on Broadway (1974).  In addition, on Broadway, Wright replaced Ben Vereen as the Leading Player in Pippin (1972). He originated the role of Mayor Joe Clark in Mule Bone (1991).

Wright played Enos' partner Officer Turk Adams in the TV series Enos, the Dukes of Hazzard spin-off and portrayed jazz trumpeter and composer Dizzy Gillespie in Clint Eastwood film Bird. He also played the part of Jericho on the short-lived Fox television program Jonny Zero.

Music and voice-over work
Wright narrated the 1988 documentary film Thelonious Monk: Straight, No Chaser, produced by Clint Eastwood.

Wright performed and recorded several songs for the Walt Disney animated film The Little Mermaid, as Sebastian the Crab, and is widely known for the songs "Under the Sea", and "Kiss the Girl". He voiced Sebastian in The Little Mermaid sequels and spin-offs, including The Little Mermaid 2 and The Little Mermaid: Ariel's Beginning, and recorded several albums in reggae style, among them — Party Gras!. Wright also voiced Kron, the leader of the Iguanadon herd, in another Disney animation Dinosaur.

He released a soul music single in 1973, "There's Something Funny Going On" backed with "Three Hundred Pounds of Hungry" on the Paramount Records label.

Personal life and death
Wright met his wife Amanda Wright, a dance director, at a production of Two Gentlemen of Verona in London's West End. They married on June 14, 1974. Together they had three children: Keely, Dee, and Sam Jr.

Wright died from prostate cancer at his home in Walden, New York on May 24, 2021, aged 74. The cancer had been diagnosed three years earlier.

Filmography

Film

Television

Video games

Theatre

Discography 
 Disney's Sebastian from the Little Mermaid (1990)
 Party Gras! (1991)

References

External links

 
 Samuel E. Wright at AllMusic
 

1946 births
2021 deaths
20th-century African-American male singers
20th-century American male actors
21st-century African-American male singers
21st-century American male actors
African-American male actors
American male film actors
American male musical theatre actors
American male television actors
American male voice actors
Deaths from cancer in New York (state)
Deaths from prostate cancer
Male actors from South Carolina
People from Camden, South Carolina
People from Walden, New York